Herod and Mariamne is a 1671 tragedy by the English writer Samuel Pordage. It was first performed by the Duke's Company at the Lincoln's Inn Fields Theatre in London shortly before they moved to the Dorset Gardens Theatre. It was the company's attempt to respond to the great success of John Dryden's heroic drama The Conquest of Granada by the rival King's Company. It is inspired by the accounts of Josephus portraying the reign of Herod II.

Cast
 Matthew Medbourne as Herod
 John Crosby as Pheroras
  John Lee as Alexas
 William Smith as Tyridates 
 Henry Norris as Arsanes 
 Anthony Leigh as Polites
 Thomas Gillow as Sosius
 Mary Betterton as Mariamne 
 Mary Lee as Salome
 Margaret Osborne as Alexandra

References

Bibliography
 Howe, Elizabeth. The First English Actresses: Women and Drama, 1660-1700. Cambridge University Press, 1992.
 Nicoll, Allardyce. History of English Drama, 1660-1900: Volume 1, Restoration Drama, 1660-1700. Cambridge University Press, 1952.
 Van Lennep, W. The London Stage, 1660-1800: Volume One, 1660-1700. Southern Illinois University Press, 1960.

1671 plays
West End plays
Tragedy plays
Plays by Samuel Pordage